An eclipse season is the period, roughly every six months, when eclipses occur. Eclipse seasons are the result of the axial parallelism of the Moon's tilted orbital plane (tilted five degrees to the Earth's orbital plane), just as Earth's weather seasons are the result of the axial parallelism of Earth's tilted axis as it orbits around the Sun. During the season, the "lunar nodes" – the line where the Moon's orbital plane intersects with the Earth's orbital plane – aligns with the Sun and Earth, such that a solar eclipse is formed during the new moon phase and a lunar eclipse is formed during the full moon phase.

Only two (or occasionally three) eclipse seasons occur during each year, and each season lasts about 35 days and repeats just short of six months later, thus two full eclipse seasons always occur each year. Either two or three eclipses happen each eclipse season. During the eclipse season, the Moon is at a low ecliptic latitude (less than around 1.5° north or south), hence the Sun, Moon, and Earth become aligned straightly enough (in syzygy) for an eclipse to occur. Eclipse seasons should occur 38 times within a saros period (6,585.3 days).

The type of each solar eclipse (whether total or annular, as seen from the sublunar point) depends on the apparent sizes of the Sun and Moon, which are functions of the distances of Earth from the Sun and of the Moon from Earth, respectively, as seen from Earth's surface. These distances vary because both the Earth and the Moon have elliptic orbits.

If both orbits were coplanar (i.e. on the same plane) with each other, then two eclipses would happen every lunar month (29.53 days), assuming the Earth had a perfectly circular orbit centered around the Sun, and the Moon's orbit was also perfectly circular and centered around the Earth. A lunar eclipse would occur at every full moon, a solar eclipse every new moon, and all solar eclipses would be the same type.

Details
An eclipse season is the only time when the Sun (from the perspective of the Earth) is close enough to one of the Moon's nodes to allow an eclipse to occur. During the season, whenever there is a full moon a lunar eclipse will occur and whenever there is a new moon a solar eclipse will occur. If the Sun is close enough to a node, then a total eclipse will occur. Each season lasts from 31 to 37 days, and seasons recur about every 6 months. At least two (one solar and one lunar, in any order), and at most three eclipses (solar, lunar, then solar again, or vice versa), will occur during every eclipse season. This is because it is about 15 days (a fortnight) between full moon and new moon and vice versa. If there is an eclipse at the very beginning of the season, then there is enough time (30 days) for two more eclipses.

In other words, because the eclipse season (34 days long on average) is longer than the synodic month (one lunation, or the time for the Moon to return to a particular phase and about 29.5 days), the Moon will be new or full at least two, and up to three, times during the season. Eclipse seasons occur slightly shy of six months apart (successively occurring every 173.31 days - half of an eclipse year), the time it takes the Sun to travel from one node to the next along the ecliptic. If the last eclipse of an eclipse season occurs at the very beginning of a calendar year, it is possible for a total of seven eclipses to occur since there is still time before the end of the calendar year for two full eclipse seasons, each having up to three eclipses.

Examples: Part 1 out of 4

Visual sequence of two particular eclipse seasons
In each sequence below, each eclipse is separated by a fortnight. The first and last eclipse in each sequence is separated by one synodic month. See also Eclipse cycles.

(The two eclipse seasons above share similarities (lunar or solar centrality and gamma of each eclipse in the same column) because they are a half saros apart.)

22-year chart of eclipses (1999–2020) demonstrating seasons

The penumbral lunar eclipse of November 29–30, 2020 was followed by the solar eclipse of December 14, 2020.

Examples: Part 2 out of 4

Visual sequence of two particular eclipse seasons
In each sequence below, each eclipse is separated by a fortnight. The first and last eclipse in each sequence is separated by one synodic month. See also Eclipse cycles.

(The two eclipse seasons above share similarities (lunar or solar centrality and gamma of each eclipse in the same column) because they are a half saros apart.)

Examples: Part 3 out of 4

Visual sequence of two particular eclipse seasons
In each sequence below, each eclipse is separated by a fortnight. The first and last eclipse in each sequence is separated by one synodic month. See also Eclipse cycles.

(The two eclipse seasons above share similarities (lunar or solar centrality and gamma of each eclipse in the same column) because they are a half saros apart.)

Examples: Part 4 out of 4

Visual sequence of two particular eclipse seasons
In each sequence below, each eclipse is separated by a fortnight. The first and last eclipse in each sequence is separated by one synodic month. See also Eclipse cycles.

(The two eclipse seasons above share similarities (lunar or solar centrality and gamma of each eclipse in the same column) because they are a half saros apart.)

See also
Eclipse cycle
Ecliptic
Lunar node
Lunar phase
Orbit of the Moon
Orbital inclination
Syzygy

References

External links
NASA Eclipse Web Site
Sun-centered animation of moon inclination UNL Astronomy

Season
Moon
Time in astronomy
Units of time